Huh Mi-mi (born 19 December 2002) is a South Korean judoka. She won a gold medal in −57 kg, at the 2022 Judo Grand Slam Tbilisi, and 2022 Judo Grand Slam Abu Dhabi.

She competed at the  2019 World Judo Juniors Championships. She placed fifth at the 2022 World Judo Championships, in Tashkent .

References

External links
 
 

Korean judoka
2002 births
Living people
21st-century South Korean women